is a Japanese actor, voice actor and singer. He is best known for his roles on Steins;Gate, Durarara!!, Death Note, Soul Eater, Wolf's Rain, Ouran High School Host Club, Ajin: Demi-Human, Fullmetal Alchemist: Brotherhood, Free!, Mobile Suit Gundam 00, Hunter x Hunter, Chihayafuru, Bungo Stray Dogs, Uta no Prince-sama and Zombieland Saga. He was nominated for the award for Death Note at the 1st Seiyu Awards and won the "Best Voice Actor" award at the 2008 Tokyo International Anime Fair. At the 2nd Seiyu Awards, he won "Best Lead Actor Award" for his role as Setsuna F. Seiei in Mobile Suit Gundam 00 and as Hakugen Rikuson in Kōtetsu Sangokushi. His debut single, was released at King Records. In March 2009, his debut album Break was released.

Personal life 
Miyano was born in Saitama Prefecture in the Kantō region of Honshu, Japan on June 8, 1983.

Miyano joined Himawari Theatre Group under the influence of his older brother Shota, though he did not attend the class often. After entering high school and due to the uncertainty he felt toward the future, Miyano skipped singing and dance lessons. While taking music lessons, he started to discover his musical style through the encounter with music produced by singers like CHEMISTRY and EXILE. In 2008, Miyano announced he was married and his wife was pregnant. They have a son.

Career

1992–2008: Early roles and musical breakthrough 
Miyano played a boy in a gangster's childhood flashback in Tokusou Exceedraft. In 2001, he debuted as a voice actor in the live action teen drama Caitlin's Way. He voiced Riku in the Japanese version of the video game Kingdom Hearts and played his first anime role in Shin Megami Tensei: Devil Children - Light & Dark. Miyano voiced Kiba, the main character in the anime series Wolf's Rain. He joined the cast of The Prince of Tennis Musical playing . He reprised his role in Kingdom Hearts: Chain of Memories and Kingdom Hearts II. Miyano voiced Light Yagami in the anime series Death Note.  For his performance, Miyano was nominated for two awards at the inaugural Seiyuu Awards: "Best Lead Actor" and "Best New Actor". He made his film debut for The Prince of Tennis. 

Miyano made his singing debut, releasing his first single  for King Records label on May 28, 2007. "Kuon" debuted at #47 on the Oricon charts which became the finale theme song in the anime series Kōtetsu Sangokushi. He released a duet with Romi Park, entitled "Fight", which debuted at # 73 on the Oricon chart on June 13, 2007. Miyano reprised his role for Kingdom Hearts Re:Chain of Memories. Miyano voiced Setsuna F. Seiei, the main character in Mobile Suit Gundam 00. He won his first award, "Best Voice Actor", at the 2008 Tokyo International Anime Fair for his portrayal of Light Yagami and Setsuna F. Seiei. 

On June 4, 2008, he released his second single, "Discovery", used as which became the intro song for the video game Fushigi Yūgi: Suzaku Ibun. The song debuted at # 24 on the Oricon chart. In August, Miyano released the character single "Soup/Hakosora", entitled "Mamoru Miyano Comes Across Setsuna F. Seiei" (宮野真守 come across 刹那・F・セイエイ), debuting at # 18. In December he released his third single, which also debuted at # 18.  That year, Miyano reprised the role of Setsuna F. Seiei for the second season of Mobile Suit Gundam 00 for which he won his first Seiyuu Award and another for the role of Hakugen Rikuson in Kōtetsu Sangokushi. He has also voiced Zero Kiryu and Ichiru Kiryu both from the series Vampire Knight and Vampire Knight Guilty, as well as Death The Kid in the anime Soul Eater. He voiced Tamaki Suoh in the anime version of Ouran High School Host Club, Rintaro Okabe in Steins Gate, Ling Yao in Fullmetal Alchemist: Brotherhood, Oda Nobunaga in Nobunaga the Fool, Rin Matsuoka in Free!, and Osamu Dazai in Bungou Stray Dogs. Miyano appeared on-camera, including a guest spot on the 2008 drama The Quiz Show.

2009–present: Subsequent success 
On March 11, 2009, Miyano released his debut album, Break, which debuted at number 20. On April 11, 2009, a month after the release of his album, Miyano went on his first tour, 1st Live Tour 2009: Breaking. His notable roles is a tokusatsu character named Ultraman Zero, the son of Ultraseven who first made his debut in the movie Mega Monster Battle: Ultra Galaxy Legend The Movie before starring in subsequent movies Ultraman Zero: The Revenge of Belial and Ultraman Saga. Lacking a series of his own, Zero continued to appear as the main host of Ultraman Retsuden/Shin Ultraman Retsuden and in subsequent Ultra Series entries, with the recent being Ultraman Z in 2020.

In 2010, Miyano released his second album, Wonder. The album charted at number 20 on the Oricon Weekly Albums chart. Following the album's release, Miyano went on his second tour, Mamoru Miyano Live Tour 2010: Wondering. He voiced Dent in the popular Pokémon anime series. He starred in Daisuke Namikawa's live action film Wonderful World.

Miyano participated in the 2011 theatrical play Ultraman Premier in Tokyo, where he portrayed Shin Moroboshi, the human guise of Ultraman Zero. In April 2012, Miyano released his third album, Fantasista. The album charted at number 4 on the Oricon Weekly Albums chart. Miyano made his first appearance on NHK's music variety show Music Japan. In 2013, he became the first male voice actor to perform solo at Nippon Budokan arena.

In April 2014, he released the DVD for his 5th live tour, "～TRAVELING!～". The following month he began his 6th live tour ~Wakening!~ where he traveled around Japan. The DVD was released January 28, 2015.

In 2015, he became the first male voice actor with number 1 single on Oricon daily chart.

On July 10, 2016, he was one of the performers to appear in "Ultraman Day", a festival that celebrated the 50th anniversary of Ultra Series.

On February 11 and 12, 2017, he held his first solo foreign concert in Taiwan. In June 2017, he became the first male voice actor to top weekly Blu-ray chart.

In December 2018, Miyano made his first appearance on FNS Music Festival performing duets with Nana Mizuki and Hiromi Go.

Discography

Albums

Singles

Promotional singles

Video releases

Music video collections

Filmography

Anime series

Specials

Original net animation (ONA) & Original video animation (OVA)

Anime films

Video games

Dubbing

Live-action

Animation

Drama CD
 Dolls (Seiju Shikibu)
 Free! (Rin Matsuoka)
 Karneval (Yogi)
 Mobile Suit Gundam 00 (Setsuna F. Seiei)
 Ouran High School Host Club (Tamaki Suoh)
 Soul Eater (Death the Kid)
 Starry Sky (Shiki Kagurazaka)
 Steins;Gate (Rintaro Okabe)
 Uta no Prince-sama (Tokiya Ichinose)
 Vampire Knight (Zero Kiryu and Ichiru Kiryu)
 Fate/stay night: Garden of Avalon - glorious, after image (Bedivere)
 Fire Emblem Fates (Leo)
 Bungo Stray Dogs (Osamu Dazai)

Comics
 Strobe Edge (Ren Ichinose)

Live-action

Theater

Radio

Awards

References

External links
  
 Official music site 
 
 
 

1983 births
Living people
Best Actor Seiyu Award winners
Crunchyroll Anime Awards winners
Japanese male child actors
Japanese male film actors
Japanese male musical theatre actors
Japanese male pop singers
Japanese male television actors
Japanese male rock singers
Japanese male video game actors
Japanese male voice actors
King Records (Japan) artists
Male voice actors from Saitama Prefecture
Musicians from Saitama Prefecture
Seiyu Award winners
20th-century Japanese male actors
21st-century Japanese male actors
20th-century Japanese male singers
20th-century Japanese singers
21st-century Japanese male singers
21st-century Japanese singers